Kurt Leroy Haws (born September 25, 1969) is a former American football tight end in the National Football League for the Washington Redskins. He played college football at the University of Utah and was drafted in the fourth round of the 1994 NFL Draft. Haws was also selected by the Carolina Panthers in the 1995 NFL Expansion Draft. From 1989-1991 he was on a Mormon mission in Venezuela.

References 

1969 births
Living people
American football tight ends
Washington Redskins players
Sportspeople from Mesa, Arizona
Utah Utes football players